Alexander Hart (born 17 September 1985) is a Swedish-American bandy and floorball player.

He has represented bandy clubs in Norway, Finland, Sweden and Russia. In 2016, he won the Russian Floorball silver medal with Spartak Moscow. Later that same year he represented Team USA at the 2016 Men's World Floorball Championships, and in 2017 he transferred to Czech floorball club FBC Česká Lípa. In chess, he was a pupil of German International Master Matthias Duppel and Russian Grandmaster Sergey Kudrin. His great grandfather was Swedish brain surgeon and bandy player Herbert Olivecrona.

References 

Swedish bandy players
Swedish floorball players
1985 births
Living people
Sportspeople from Stockholm
American bandy players
American floorball players
IFK Motala players